Northwest Arm is a natural arm of approximately 20 miles in length and average of 1 mile wide located on the south side of Random Island at the inner region of Trinity Bay in the Canadian province of Newfoundland and Labrador.

Together with Smith Sound it makes a continuous channel which is the longest inshore waterway in the province at approximately 44 miles.

Bays of Newfoundland and Labrador

External links 
Northwest Arm